
Gmina Kaczory is a rural gmina (administrative district) in Piła County, Greater Poland Voivodeship, in west-central Poland.

Villages
Gmina Kaczory contains the villages and settlements of Brodna, Byszewice, Dziembówko, Dziembowo, Jeziorki, Kaczory, Krzewina, Morzewo, Prawomyśl, Równopole, Rzadkowo, Śmiłowo and Zelgniewo.

Neighbouring gminas
Gmina Kaczory is bordered by the town of Piła and by the gminas of Chodzież, Krajenka, Miasteczko Krajeńskie, Ujście and Wysoka.

References
Polish official population figures 2006

Kaczory
Piła County